Anarchist Struggle (TA) is an anarchist auxiliary military unit, composed mainly of international volunteers, that is involved in the Rojava conflict of the Syrian Civil War. It was founded in 2017 and later integrated into the International Freedom Battalion.

It is the fourth known anarchist unit of the Syrian Democratic Forces.

History
Although Tekoşîna Anarşîst has been active since August 2017, the unit did not publicly announce its existence until January 10, 2019, when it released an official statement, quickly picked up by websites such as It's Going Down, Enough is Enough and Voices in Movement.

Battle of Afrin
At the beginning of 2018, in the face of Turkey's invasion of the Afrin canton, a unit of international volunteers called the Anti-Fascist Forces in Afrin (AFFA) was formed, and the members of Anarchist Struggle were integrated into it. The group participated in the Battle of Afrin in early 2018 against the Turkish Army and the Free Syrian Army. In the battle, dozens of international volunteers lost their lives in combat. One of them was Şevger Ara Makhno, nom de guerre of a young militant Turkish anarchist. The identity of the young man was not disclosed to protect his family from possible reprisals, because they live in Turkey.

Deir ez-Zor offensive
After the Battle of Afrin, the group mobilized to the town of Al-Baghuz Fawqani to carry out medical assistance tasks for the fighters and mobilize volunteers to fight against the last stronghold of the Islamic State in Syria. On March 18, 2019, an ISIS-related media announced on a Telegram channel the death of an "Italian crusader" in an ambush during the Battle of Baghuz. The killed victim was Lorenzo Orsetti, a 33-year-old anarchist from Florence, who joined as a fighter in Anarchist Struggle. His death was then confirmed by the both anarchist unit and by the YPG. The news shocked public opinion in Italy, the young anarchist was classified as a "hero" by various media and personalities in Italy, while others stood out to criticize the "Italian hypocrisy" in front of international volunteers who join the Kurds and upon returning to Italy are prosecuted. His body was repatriated days later to Florence, his hometown. Lorenzo was vindicated by various anarchist and leftist organizations and media such as the Federazione Anarchica Italiana.

See also
International Revolutionary People's Guerrilla Forces
Revolutionary Union for Internationalist Solidarity

References 

Anarchism in Syria
Anarchist militant groups
Anti-ISIL factions in Syria
Expatriate units and formations in the Syrian civil war
Guerrilla organizations
International Freedom Battalion
Resistance movements
Revolutionary movements